The Read/Write Library is "a repository of pamphlets, zines, community plans, oral histories, neighborhood newspapers, literary magazines from CPS schools and state prisons, parish-church and settlement-house cookbooks, self-published poetry and novels, and other ephemera that, taken together, tells the story of Chicago by Chicagoans in their own words, not filtered through the perspectives of academics or journalists."

The library was founded by Nell Taylor in 2006 as the Chicago Underground Library. The library started out in the now-defunct MoJoe's coffee shop, a Roscoe Village hangout and hub for zine-related activity in Chicago.

It moved to Humboldt Park in 2011.

References

External links

Libraries in Chicago
501(c)(3) organizations
2006 establishments in Illinois
Volunteer cooperatives
West Side, Chicago
Libraries established in 2006
Research libraries in the United States